Cantabrigian Rowing Club, known as Cantabs, is a 'town' (or CRA) rowing and sculling club in Cambridge, UK.

History
Cantabs was founded in 1950 as a rowing club for the old boys of the Hills Road Sixth Form College, then the Cambridgeshire High School for Boys. It first accepted general membership in the 1960s and has been an open club since.  The club is affiliated to the Cambridgeshire Rowing Association and British Rowing.

The club is consistently one of the fastest on the River Cam, holding the men's headship in the Town Bumps for seven of the last eight years and the women's headship since 2017. The Cantabs women's A crew consistently finish as the fastest Cambridge town club at the Women's Eights Head of the River Race, and finished 14th overall in 2017, winning the Provincial Pennant. Cantabs' B, C, D and E crews at WEHoRR were also faster than their counterparts from other Cambridge town clubs, and finished as the fastest B, C, D and E crews in the Provincial event.

The club runs the Cambridge Winter Head every November, an event that regularly attracts over seventeen hundred competitors, and is the largest one-day event on the Cam.

Facilities

The club is based out of its own boat house in Chesterton on the banks of the River Cam. The boat house has a purpose-built indoor training space upstairs, with weights facilities installed in 2016, along with static and dynamic ergs, BikeErgs and a SkiErg. Rack space for boats ranging from single sculls to eights is located both downstairs and outside. The club also makes use of the CRA boat house and Fitzwilliam College boat house in Cambridge, primarily for Cantabs' large and vibrant junior squad and for adaptive rowing for people with disabilities.

Financial support for this development includes Olympic legacy funding from Sport England’s Inspired Facilities Fund.

Squads

The club is open to rowers, scullers and coxes of all ages, from the junior level up to masters level. Cantabs runs a number of different men's, women's and junior squads which cater for the social rower to those who wish to train and race competitively at a high level. There are a number of different squads which mean that different commitment levels and aspirations can be catered for.

The Senior Men's Squad has qualified at least one boat for Henley Royal Regatta in the majority of the last decade  and in 2012 qualified two eights for the Thames Challenge Cup, a first for any Cambridge town club. In addition, there has been substantial individual success, with John Hale winning silver in the lightweight sculls at the 2012 British Rowing Championships before representing England in the lightweight double at the Home International Regatta and Charlie Palmer reaching the finals of the Diamond Challenge Sculls in 2005 and 2006. He is currently a biology teacher at Bedford School

The Senior Women's Squad races competitively at the major Tideway heads, as well as local and national regattas and, in 2015, two crews raced at Ghent International Regatta, with the women's pair winning their event (this pair went on to represent England at the Home International Regatta). Cantabs have had the fastest Cambridge town first and second eights at the Women's Eights Head of the River Race for the past few years, winning the Provincial Pennant when finishing 14th overall in 2017. In 2016, the senior squad won gold at the British Rowing Masters Championships in the women's A1x and C4-, won W.MasC.4+ at the Veteran Fours Head of the River, and won the IM1 pairs event at Pairs Head, where they were also the 2nd fastest W2- overall. In 2017, Cantabrigian won the Club 8+ event at Henley Women's Regatta, setting a new course record in the process.

The club has also had success with adaptive/para rowing, with Claire Connon winning the para event at Henley Women's Regatta in 2015, and representing England at the Home International Regatta on two occasions.

Club colours
The blade colours are dark blue and silver; kit: white, trimmed with blue.

Town bumps 
Cantabs has held both the men's and women's headship in the CRA Bumps since 2017. The women's 2nd and 3rd and 4th eights are the highest ranked 2nd, 3rd and 4th eights on the river, and the men's 2nd, 3rd, 4th and 5th eights are similarly the highest ranked.

Since 2015, Cantabs has consistently entered the largest number of crews of any club in the CRA Bumps, reflecting the size of the club. In 2018, 16 men's and 11 women's crews took part, comprising 25% of the overall entry, with crews bumping up a 'net' of 35 places in addition to retaining the two Headships.

Honours

Henley Royal Regatta

British champions

See also
 Cambridgeshire Rowing Association

References

External links
 Official Site
 British Rowing's Cantabrigian RC page
 Cambridgeshire Rowing Association

Cambridge town rowing clubs
Sports clubs established in 1950
Rowing clubs in Cambridgeshire
Rowing clubs in England
Rowing clubs of the River Cam